Ladybird is a live album by American saxophonist Dexter Gordon recorded at the Jazzhus Montmartre in Copenhagen, Denmark in 1965 by Danmarks Radio and released on the SteepleChase label in 2005. The album features Gordon's regular quartet with trumpeter Donald Byrd.

Critical reception 

All About Jazz reviewer Derek Taylor stated "The trumpeter's presence and the high degree of rapport shared by the rhythm section make this date one of note. Coupled with a tune choice that strays dexterously in more challenging directions than the band's usual diet of bop standards, it's a welcome program that finds Gordon in a limber and exploratory mode. Foibles in fidelity aside, Dex aficionados will be sold on the disc's face value. But casual listeners will probably also be pleasingly surprised by the caliber of this classic conclave.".

Track listing 
 "Ladybird" (Tadd Dameron) – 20:11
 "So What" (Miles Davis) – 18:08
 "Who Can I Turn To?" (Anthony Newley, Leslie Bricusse) – 5:31
 "Blues By Five" (Davis) – 4:13

Source:

Personnel 
Dexter Gordon – tenor saxophone
Donald Byrd – trumpet
Kenny Drew – piano
Niels-Henning Ørsted Pedersen – bass
Alex Riel – drums

Source:

References 

SteepleChase Records live albums
Dexter Gordon live albums
1965 live albums
Albums recorded at Jazzhus Montmartre